Baby Face Killa is the ninth mixtape by American rapper Freddie Gibbs.  It was released on September 25, 2012. It is the first installment of the Gangsta Grillz series featuring Gary, Indiana based Freddie Gibbs.

The mixtape was announced shortly after the release of the previous street album Cold Day In Hell. There are 18 tracks on the street album and additional bonus tracks on the deluxe edition that were released on iTunes. The mixtape features guest appearances from Pharrell Williams, Dana Williams, Z-Ro, Young Jeezy, Slick Pulla, Ea$y Money, YG, Dom Kennedy, SpaceGhostPurrp, Krayzie Bone, Jadakiss, Jay Rock, Wayne Blazed, Curren$y, Problem, G-Wiz, D-Edge, Hit Skrewface & Kirko Bangz. The second track "Still Livin'" was featured in the video game Grand Theft Auto V.

Track listing

References

2012 mixtape albums
DJ Drama albums
Freddie Gibbs albums
Albums produced by T-Minus (record producer)
Albums produced by Statik Selektah
Albums produced by DJ Mustard
Albums produced by DJ Dahi